Michael Silver is an American sportswriter and television analyst who currently works for Bally Sports. He previously worked for Sports Illustrated, Yahoo Sports, and NFL Network.

Biography

Early life and education
Silver was born in San Francisco in 1966 and raised in Los Angeles. He graduated from the University of California, Berkeley.

Career
Silver began his career as a sports writer and columnist for the Santa Rosa Press Democrat, where he covered the San Francisco 49ers and Golden State Warriors from 1990 to 1994. He also covered the 49ers for the Sacramento Union and served as a correspondent for Pro Football Weekly and The Sporting News.

Silver began work at Sports Illustrated in November 1994, eventually becoming a senior writer there. He was one of the magazine's lead football writers, having authored game stories for Super Bowl XXIX through XLI and personal profiles of famous sports characters. He has also written articles for GQ and Rolling Stone.

Silver started working for Yahoo Sports at the beginning of the 2007 NFL season and was hired by NFL Network in 2013. He left NFL Network in 2021 and began working for Bally Sports in October of that year.

Published works
Rice with Jerry Rice (St. Martin's Press, 1996)
Walk on the Wild Side with Dennis Rodman (Delacorte Press, 1997) 
All Things Possible with Kurt Warner (HarperSanFrancisco, 2000)
Golden Girl with Natalie Coughlin (Rodale Press, 2006)

Awards
Silver, who lists pro football, pro basketball, tennis and college softball as his favorite sports to cover, has received numerous writing awards from several organizations, including the Pro Football Writers of America, the Associated Press Sports Editors and the Pro Basketball Writers of America.

References

External links
Sports Illustrated archive of Silver's contributions
Yahoo! Sports archive of Silver's contributions

American sportswriters
Living people
Softball mass media
Year of birth missing (living people)
Place of birth missing (living people)
Writers from California
Softball in the United States